Jacquot is a French surname. Notable people with the surname include:

Benoît Jacquot (born 1947), French film director
Charles Jean-Baptiste Jacquot (1812–1880), French writer better known by his pen name Eugène de Mirecourt 
Georges Jacquot (1794-1874), French sculptor of the 19th century
Joe Jacquot, Deputy Attorney General of the state of Florida, USA
Martine L. Jacquot (born 1955), French-born Canadian academic, novelist, poet, short story writer, journalist
Rene Jacquot (born 1961), French professional boxer and world title holder

See also
Jacot

French-language surnames